is a private university in Kanagawa-ku, Yokohama, Kanagawa Prefecture Japan. It was established in 2004 and offers a graduate studies and post-doctorate studies program

External links
 Official website 

Educational institutions established in 2004
Private universities and colleges in Japan
Universities and colleges in Yokohama
2004 establishments in Japan